Rocío is a Spanish female name, literally meaning "dew". Notable people with the name include:

Rocío Banquells (1958), Mexican pop singer and actress
Rocío Carrasco, Rociíto (1977), Spanish TV presenter and business woman
Rocío Comba (1987), Argentine discus thrower
Rocío Dúrcal (1944–2006), Spanish singer and actress
Rocío González Navas (born 1953), former First Lady of Ecuador
Rocío González (politician), Peruvian politician
Rocío Igarzábal (1989), also known as "Rochi Igarzábal", Argentine actress, singer and model
Rocío Jurado (1946–2006), Spanish singer and actress
Rocío Lara, a Muppeteer for Plaza Sésamo playing the character Lola
Rocío Marengo (1980), Argentinian model and actress
Rocío Orsi (1976-2014), Spanish philosopher and professor
Rocío Ríos (1969), long-distance runner from Spain
Rocío Ruiz, Spanish football defender
Rocío Sánchez Moccia, Argentine field hockey player
Rocío Urquijo (1935–2009), Spanish artist
Rocío Ybarra (1984), field hockey defender from Spain

See also
Virgin of El Rocío
Hermitage of El Rocío, Almonte
Romería de El Rocío pilgrimage

Spanish feminine given names